Cyberpunk 2077 is a 2020 action role-playing video game developed by CD Projekt Red and published by CD Projekt. Set in Night City, an open world set in the Cyberpunk universe, players assume the role of a customisable mercenary known as V, who can acquire skills in hacking and machinery with options for melee and ranged combat. The main story follows V's struggle as they deal with a mysterious cybernetic implant that threatens to overwrite their body with the personality and memories of a deceased celebrity only perceived by V; the two must work together to be separated and save V's life.

The game's development began following the release of The Witcher 3: Wild Hunt – Blood and Wine (2016). The game was developed by a team of around 500 people using the REDengine 4 game engine. CD Projekt launched a new division in Wrocław, Poland, and partnered with Digital Scapes, Nvidia, QLOC, and Jali Research to aid the production. Cyberpunk creator Mike Pondsmith was a consultant, and actor Keanu Reeves has a starring role. The original score was led by Marcin Przybyłowicz, featuring the contributions of several licensed artists.

After years of anticipation, CD Projekt released Cyberpunk 2077 for PlayStation 4, Stadia, Windows, and Xbox One on 10 December 2020, followed by PlayStation 5 and Xbox Series X/S on 15 February 2022. It received praise from critics for its narrative, setting, and graphics, although some of its gameplay elements received mixed responses, while its themes and representation of transgender characters received some criticism. It was also widely criticized for bugs, particularly in the console versions, which suffered from performance problems; Sony removed it from the PlayStation Store from December 2020 to June 2021 while CD Projekt rectified some of the problems. CD Projekt became subject to investigations and class-action lawsuits for their perceived attempts at downplaying the severity of the technical problems before release; these were ultimately cleared with a settlement of US$1.85 million. By April 2022, the game had sold more than 18 million copies. An expansion, Phantom Liberty, is set to release in 2023 on PC and ninth generation of video game consoles. A sequel is in development.

Gameplay 

Cyberpunk 2077 is an action role-playing game played in a first-person perspective as V, a mercenary whose voice, face, hairstyles, body type and modifications, background, and clothing are customisable. Stat categories—Body, Intelligence, Reflexes, Technical, and Cool—are influenced by the character classes that players assume, which are NetRunner (hacking), Techie (machinery), and Solo (combat). V must consult a "ripperdoc" to upgrade and purchase cyberware implants; black markets offer military-grade abilities. The rarity of any given equipment is shown by a coloured tier system. V can take cover, aim, run, jump, double jump, and slide. Melee strikes can be dealt with close-combat weapons. There are three types of ranged weapons, all of which can be customised and modified—Power (standard), Tech (which penetrate walls and enemies), and Smart (with homing bullets). Ranged weapons are equipped to ricochet bullets in a target's direction and slow them down in bullet time. Four types of damage can be inflicted and resisted—Physical, Thermal, EMP, and Chemical. Weapon use increases accuracy and reloading speed, which are manifested in character animations. Gunsmiths repair and upgrade weapons. The game can be completed without killing anyone, with non-lethal options for weapons and cyberware.

The open world metropolis of Night City consists of six regions; the corporate City Centre, immigrant-inhabited Watson, luxurious Westbrook, suburban Heywood, gang-infested Pacifica, and industrial Santo Domingo. Its surrounding area, the Badlands, can also be explored. V navigates these locations on foot and in vehicles, which are subject to either a third- or first-person view. Pedestrians are vulnerable to vehicular collisions. Depending on the location, law enforcement may be alerted if V commits a crime. Radio stations are available to listen to. The full day-night cycle and dynamic weather affect the way non-player characters (NPCs) behave. V owns an apartment and a garage. Night City features non-English-speaking characters, whose languages can be translated with special implants. "Braindance" is a device that allows V to undergo other people's experiences. Branching dialogues enable interaction with NPCs and actions in quests. Experience points are obtained from main quests and fuel the stats; side quests yield "street cred", unlocking skills, vendors, places, and additional quests. Quests are acquired from characters known as Fixers. Throughout the game, V is aided by various companions. Consumables, like soft drinks, are used for healing, and objects can be inspected in V's inventory. Minigames include hacking, boxing, auto racing, martial arts, and shooting ranges. The player's in-game choices can lead to different endings.

Synopsis

Setting 

Night City is an American megacity in the Free State of North California, controlled by corporations and unassailed by the laws of both country and state. It sees conflict from rampant gang wars and its ruling entities contending for dominance. The city relies on robotics for everyday aspects like waste collection, maintenance, and public transportation. Its visual identity is derived from the four eras it underwent—austere Entropism, colourful Kitsch, imposing Neo-Militarism, and opulent Neo-Kitsch. Homelessness abounds but does not preclude cybernetic modification for the poor, giving rise to cosmetic addiction and consequent violence. These threats are dealt with by the armed force known as Psycho Squad. Trauma Team can be employed for rapid medical services. Because of the constant threat of physical harm, all citizens are allowed to carry firearms in public openly.

Plot 
The game begins with the selection of one of three lifepaths for the player character V (Gavin Drea or Cherami Leigh): Nomad, Streetkid, or Corpo. All three lifepaths involve V starting a new life in Night City with local thug Jackie Welles (Jason Hightower) and having various adventures with a netrunner, T-Bug.

In 2077, local fixer Dexter DeShawn (Michael-Leon Wooley) hires V and Welles to steal a biochip known as "the Relic" from Arasaka Corporation. They acquire the Relic, but the plan goes awry when they witness the murder of the megacorp's leader Saburo Arasaka (Masane Tsukayama) at the hands of his treacherous son Yorinobu (Hideo Kimura). Yorinobu covers up the murder as poisoning and triggers a security sweep in which Arasaka's netrunners kill T-Bug. V and Welles escape, but Welles is fatally wounded in the process, and the Relic's protective case is damaged, forcing V to insert the biochip into the cyberware in their head.

Furious at the unwanted police attention, DeShawn shoots V in the head and leaves them for dead in a landfill. Upon awakening, V is haunted by the digital ghost of war veteran turned iconic rock star Johnny Silverhand (Keanu Reeves), believed to have died in 2023 during an attempted thermonuclear attack on Arasaka Tower. V learns from their ripperdoc Viktor Vector (Michael Gregory) that DeShawn's bullet triggered resurrection nanotech on the biochip, repairing the damage to V's brain but starting an irreversible process to overwrite their memories with those of Silverhand, leaving V only a few weeks before the process completes. The biochip cannot be removed, so V must find a way to remove Silverhand and survive.

Through reliving Silverhand's memories, V learns that in 2023, Silverhand's then-girlfriend Alt Cunningham (Alix Wilton Regan) had created Soulkiller, an artificial intelligence able to copy netrunners' minds through their neural links. However, the process destroyed the target's brain. Arasaka kidnapped Cunningham and forced her to create their own version of Soulkiller, which would store the minds of its targets in Arasaka's digital fortress, Mikoshi. Silverhand led a rescue effort to save Cunningham, but failed to find her before Arasaka used Soulkiller on her; Silverhand's later thermonuclear attack was a cover to free Alt's consciousness from Arasaka's subnet, but Arasaka captured him and used Soulkiller on him as well.

By 2077, Arasaka was advertising a "Secure Your Soul" program and conducting secret research into writing a digital copy of a mind into a living human brain, from which the Relic arose. Eventually, V must decide whether to mount an attack on Arasaka Tower to gain physical access to Mikoshi and use Soulkiller to remove Silverhand from their body, or to make a deal with Arasaka to extract the Relic.

Depending upon player actions throughout the game, V can choose different options to conduct the attack. V can allow Silverhand to stage the attack with his former crew, suppress Silverhand and mount the attack with a network of allies assembled during the game, mount the attack solo, or simply commit suicide. Regardless, either after successfully using Soulkiller or after having Arasaka perform surgery on them, it is revealed that the damage to V's body is irreversible. Depending on player choice, V either requests Arasaka to be uploaded into Mikoshi until a suitable host body is found, remains in their body with an uncertain life expectancy, or allows Silverhand to take over permanently. If the latter is taken, Silverhand pays his respects to his friends and leaves Night City to start a new life.

Development 

Cyberpunk 2077 was developed by CD Projekt Red's studios in Warsaw and Kraków, while the Wrocław office devoted about forty people to research and development. It is based on Mike Pondsmith's Cyberpunk role-playing game franchise; Pondsmith started consulting on the project in 2012. He also appears in it as a character. The game drew its influences from the 1982 film Blade Runner, manga and anime series Ghost in the Shell, and video games System Shock (1994) and Deus Ex (2000). Pondsmith's follow-up to Cyberpunk V3.0, Cyberpunk Red, also made an impact on the lore. The game cost an estimated 1.2 billion Polish złoty (US$) to develop, making it one of the most expensive games ever made.

The game entered pre-production with approximately 50 staff members after CD Projekt Red finished The Witcher 3: Wild Hunt – Blood and Wine (2016). The team was expanded over time, surpassing the size of the team for The Witcher 3: Wild Hunt (2015). After the release of Wild Hunt, the team began to upgrade its REDengine 3 for Cyberpunk2077, which went on to use the engine's next iteration REDengine 4. In March 2018, a new studio opened in Wrocław to aid the production. CD Projekt Red partnered with several companies: Digital Scapes to craft additional tools, Nvidia for real time ray tracing, QLOC for quality assurance, and Jali Research to procedurally generate the lip sync for all ten localisations. In 2018, CD Projekt Red stated they had focused on optimization from the start of the project. Originally to include multiplayer features, this feature was later decided to be a post-release addition.

The first-person perspective was chosen to immerse players more than what a third-person perspective would allow. Cutscenes and gameplay were both made in first-person to seamlessly blend together. The game was to feature full nudity, which game director Adam Badowski said encapsulates the theme of transhumanism—"the body is no longer sacrum [sacred]; it's profanum [profane]". However, in the final release, the only depiction of genitalia was in the character creator- prior to actual gameplay. The quest designers focused on enabling players to decide the order in which quests are undertaken. Side quests were often made from unused parts of the main story. The story was made shorter than The Witcher 3s as CD Projekt found that many players had not finished that game as a result of its length. Animation systems were remade to better generate muscle movement, motion capture was improved, and environments were created from prefabricated designs. Reused models had their colours and details altered. Feedback from E3 2018 influenced the non-lethal playthrough and removed the male-female option in character customisation, instead basing it on voice and body type.

The script was written in Polish and a separate team translated the dialogue into English. Persons translating into languages other than English were provided with both the original Polish script and English localization. The English localization was the base for all language versions except the Polish one, however, it was not a determinant that had to be translated one-to-one and allowed translators to be creative. Some other versions, such as the Russian one, were also based on the original, if the translators knew Polish. English and Polish dialogues were recorded independently of each other, as were some of the other language versions. Screenwriters took part in the recording of Polish dialogues, providing the actors with additional information about the characters and the context of the situation, helping them put themselves into the role. Dialogues previously recorded in Polish or English could be made available to authors of later versions in order to correctly convey emotions by the actors. Polish and English actors participating in the recordings, where the game's creators were also present, could suggest changes to the dialogues, some of which were recognised.

Night City was designed with the help of urban planners, and its architecture drew on the style of Brutalism. The world is loaded with vertical streaming, a rendering technique that omits objects below and above the player's field of view, rendering only the elements that appear on the screen to save memory and make visible objects look more detailed. By August 2018, the story was completed and could facilitate a complete playthrough. The content was nearly complete by mid-2019, with the rest of development focused largely on polishing. Staff started remote work in March 2020 due to the COVID-19 pandemic, causing a halt in localisation. Despite the studio's disavowal of mandatory overtime in May and June 2019, "crunch time" was implemented in the final weeks, although Polygon reported that it has been in effect for a longer period by that time. In October2020, Cyberpunk2077 was released to manufacturing.

Marcello Gandini's designs from the '80s and '90s shaped most of the vehicles' looks. It features a motorbike from the Akira manga and anime film and a car inspired by Mad Max: Fury Road (2015).  In July 2018, actor Keanu Reeves was approached for the role of Johnny Silverhand, codenamed Mr Fusion to maintain secrecy. He would lend his likeness to, voice, and do motion capture for the character. Reeves' dialogue amount is second only to that of V. Having first spent fifteen days recording his lines, Reeves was later granted his request that Silverhand's screen presence be doubled. Masane Tsukayama portrays Arasaka Corporation leader Saburo Arasaka in Japanese for all regions and the voice acting is not localized. Musician and producer Grimes voices the frontwoman of Lizzy Wizzy and the Metadwarves.

The Witcher 3: Wild Hunt composer Marcin Przybyłowicz wrote the score with P. T. Adamczyk and Paul Leonard-Morgan. They created seven and a half hours of music, customising assets for every quest. Genres like rave, intelligent dance music, and industrial had an effect on their approach, infusing the tracks with a '90s feel. Analogue synthesizers were employed as much as could be achieved. In-game radio stations play original songs by numerous licensed artists. Sebastian Stępień served as head writer and creative director until early 2019.

Marketing and release 
Cyberpunk 2077 was announced in May 2012. Trailers for the game were released in January 2013, at E3 2018, and at E3 2019. The game was initially confirmed for Windows, with PlayStation 4 and Xbox One announced at E3 2018. Stadia was announced in August 2019.

At E3 2019, an initial release date of 16 April 2020 was announced. This was delayed to 17 September, then 19 November, and finally 10 December. The developers received death threats over the last delay. The final delay was decided suddenly, with discussions commencing a day before the initial announcement. Due to Polish law, CD Projekt was not allowed to inform every member of the development team due to its large size; around ninety percent were not informed until the last minute. Rockfish Game's Everspace 2s early access release and an expansion to Grinding Gear Games's Path of Exile, scheduled to be released in December 2020, were delayed until the following month in order to avoid competing with Cyberpunk 2077s release.

With E3 2020 cancelled because of the COVID-19 pandemic, CD Projekt's online event Night City Wire showed additional trailers, more gameplay, and making-of footage. Next-generation ports for Xbox Series X/S and PlayStation 5 were initially scheduled for release in 2021, but were delayed in October 2021, before eventually releasing on February 15, 2022. Owners of the Xbox One and PlayStation 4 versions were able to freely download the game on their respective next-generation models. The delayed standalone multiplayer was announced to launch after 2021.

The collector's edition consists of a custom box, steelbook, figurine depicting a male V, hardcover artbook, metal pin set and keychain, A Visitor's Guide to Night City, embroidered patches, world compendium, Night City postcards and map, and stickers. The standard edition also contains the compendium, postcards, map, and stickers. Digital items that come with every copy are the soundtrack, art booklet, Cyberpunk 2020 sourcebook, wallpapers, and Cyberpunk2077: Your Voice comic. Purchases through CD Projekt's subsidiary GOG.com include the digital comic Cyberpunk2077: Big City Dreams.

As with The Witcher 2 and The Witcher 3, both Warner Bros. Interactive Entertainment and Bandai Namco Entertainment served as physical distributors in North America and Central Europe, Australia, and New Zealand respectively. Spike Chunsoft published the physical PlayStation 4 copies in Japan.

Funko Pops were obtainable starting 16 April 2020. The World of Cyberpunk2077, a 192-page art book, was published by Dark Horse Books on 29 July. On 9 September, Dark Horse brought out the first issue of a comic book series called Cyberpunk 2077: Trauma Team with writer Cullen Bunn and illustrator Miguel Valderrama. CD Projekt Red held a cosplay competition from June 2019 to October 2020. A card game created alongside publisher CMON Limited, Cyberpunk2077– Afterlife: The Card Game, was slated for 2020 but has yet to be release, no updating announcements have been made and the card game's future remains uncertain. McFarlane Toys signed a three-year agreement to manufacture action figures. The Cyberpunk2077-themed Xbox One X, which includes a digital copy and downloadable content, became the final limited edition of that console. Designed with the same aesthetic were video cards, gaming chairs, energy drinks, sneakers, smartphones exclusive to China, and peripherals. From May 2020, advertising company Agora Group had newspapers, online services, and radio channels doing promotion in Poland. Their subsidiaries carried out publicity outdoors and in movie theatres, using established brands to disseminate information about the game. , an anime spin-off collaboration co-produced by CD Projekt Red and Studio Trigger, premiered on September 13, 2022 on Netflix.

The versions of Cyberpunk 2077 released in Japan and China were subject to a reduction in the amount of nudity and gore portrayed in order to meet rating agency requirements and censorship laws. A datamine of the game's source code by hackers in February 2021 revealed that content flagged for censorship in China was tagged under "Winnie the Pooh", a reference to an internet meme in which Chinese Communist Party leader Xi Jinping was compared to the titular character.

Downloadable content 
Prior to the announcement of the game's only planned expansion, Phantom Liberty, CD Projekt Red released 18 different DLCs for the game which added cosmetics and additional gameplay content. One of the DLCs released included content from the Cyberpunk: Edgerunners anime. On September 6, 2022, CD Projekt Red confirmed that an expansion, entitled Cyberpunk 2077: Phantom Liberty, would be released for PC, Xbox Series X/S, and PlayStation 5 in 2023. It is the only planned expansion for the game, with Reeves reprising his role of Johnny Silverhand. On November 16, 2022, it was confirmed that Phantom Liberty will be a paid expansion pack, akin to Witcher 3 expansions Blood and Wine and Hearts of Stone. A trailer for Phantom Liberty was released during The Game Awards 2022 which revealed Idris Elba had joined the project. 

On December 5, 2022, CD Projekt Red confirmed a "Game of the Year" edition of Cyberpunk 2077 will be released after Phantom Liberty; both are slated for a 2023 release. CD Projekt Red president Adam Kiciński commented that "it's the natural order of things", mentioning that after their previous title The Witcher 3 received the story expansions Blood and Wine and Hearts of Stone, the firm released a "Game of the Year" edition of the title, combining all released DLC, and expects the same to happen with Cyberpunk 2077.

Reception

Pre-release 
The game was highly anticipated before its release. It won over one hundred awards at E3 2018, including Best Game, Best Xbox One Game, Best PC Game, Best RPG, and People's Choice at IGN, Best Role-Playing Game and Game of the Show at Game Informer, Best of E3 at PC Gamer, and Game of the Show at GamesRadar+. The second trailer was considered one of the best at the expo, although writer William Gibson, credited with pioneering the cyberpunk subgenre, described it as "GTA skinned-over with a generic 80s retro-future". Gibson later responded more positively to the first gameplay demo. The first-person perspective, in contrast with The Witcher 3: Wild Hunts third-person, was subject to criticism. Cyberpunk2077 was the most widely discussed game of E3 2019, where it was presented awards for Best of E3 at GamesRadar+, PC Gamer, Rock, Paper, Shotgun, and Ars Technica, and Best Game, People's Choice, Best PS4 Game, Best Xbox One Game, Best PC Game, and Best RPG at IGN. The third trailer was lauded with emphasis on Reeves' reveal.

Liana Ruppert, a journalist for Game Informer who has photosensitive epilepsy, experienced a grand mal seizure while reviewing the game days before its release. The seizure was triggered by the game's "braindance" sequence, which contains red and white flashing lights that reportedly resemble the patterns produced by medical devices used to intentionally trigger seizures. In response, CD Projekt Red made a public statement and reached out to Ruppert. The company then released a patch to add a warning, and issued a later patch on 11 December to reduce the risk of inducing epileptic symptoms.

Prior to the release of the game, CD Projekt Red provided review copies of Cyberpunk to several major outlets. CD Projekt Red issued strict review embargo terms on these review copies, requiring reviewers to sign non-disclosure agreements (NDA) and only allowing for footage provided by the company to be shown in reviews; according to Wired Magazine (which did not receive a reviewer copy), violating the NDA could cost around $27,000 per violation. Concern also arose over the fact review copies were issued for the PC version of the game, ensuring that all pre-release reviews related to the PC version of the game, excluding consoles. As a result, this eroded trust from some consumers.

Post-release 

The PC, PlayStation 5 and Xbox Series releases of Cyberpunk 2077 received "generally favorable reviews" from critics, according to Metacritic. The PlayStation 4 and Xbox One versions of the game received "mixed or average reviews".

Critics praised the quality of the story as well as the depth and expansiveness of side quests, immersive atmosphere of the world, visual quality, and freshness of the cyberpunk setting. The game's systems such as crafting, driving mechanics, and combat received a mixed response. Some critics, while acknowledging the game's many strengths, nonetheless criticised its shallow portrayal of the cyberpunk genre, and also described its portrayal of related themes such as anti-capitalism and anarchism as ironic. Others took issue with the portrayal of transgender people, who they felt were fetishized by in-game material but were not given any meaningful role in the narrative. 

On launch day, the game exceeded 1 million concurrent viewers on Twitch.

Along with several post-release patches, following the release of the animated series Cyberpunk: Edgerunners on Netflix in September 2022, the game's player count on PC boosted to levels last seen with the game's initial release. The million-plus daily player count continued for at least four weeks following the release of Edgerunners.

Technical issues 
The release of Cyberpunk 2077 was a high-profile event and was considered a disastrous launch as a result of the game suffering from numerous bugs and performance issues, particularly on the PlayStation 4 and Xbox One versions. The Guardian called the release "a shambles", while The New York Times said it was among the most conspicuous disasters in the industry's history, with CD Projekt Red prominently failing to meet expectations for what was anticipated to be the biggest game release of the year. Other gaming industry commentators have described the post-launch reception of Cyberpunk 2077 as a fall from grace for CD Projekt Red, who had previously enjoyed a fiercely pro-consumer reputation.

Some of the initial reviews that had been based only on the PC version of the game were later updated to add a caveat about the notable difference in performance between this version and its console releases. Because of the game's performance on consoles, CD Projekt issued an apology, particularly for their pre-release secrecy regarding these versions, concluding that unsatisfied consumers could opt for refunds. This was initially followed by multiple reports of players unable to get said refund. CD Projekt Red later stated that they had no specific deals in place with either Microsoft or Sony to facilitate such an action; refunds are dealt with according to standard refund policies. On 17 December 2020, Sony announced that it would offer refunds to customers who had purchased Cyberpunk 2077 through the PlayStation Store and removed it from the store "until further notice"; once returned to the store in June 2021, the PlayStation Store warned users that "Users continue to experience performance issues with this game. Purchase for use on PS4 systems is not recommended." The Xbox One version of the game remained available for purchase from the online Microsoft store, albeit with a warning about the game's performance issues. Players who bought the game through the Microsoft store were also offered refunds. In the US, GameStop accepted returns of boxed versions of the game even if the box was opened, an exception to the store's usual refund policy.

Controversy 
Although the game's reviews were largely positive, its aggregate score was thought to be disappointing by analysts. CD Projekt SA stock fell by up to 9.4% after the publication of Metacritic's reviews. The reviews aggregation OpenCritic criticised CD Projekt Red for deliberately attempting to misrepresent the game, and not delivering review copies for Xbox One and PlayStation 4, knowing it would receive negative reviews. A class-action lawsuit representing those making investments in CD Projekt during 2020 was filed on 24 December 2020 in California, asserting that the company made fraudulent claims to the state of Cyberpunk 2077 as to mislead those investors; a second similar class-action suit had also been filed by January 2021. By May 2021, four separate lawsuits against CD Projekt had been filed over Cyberpunk 2077, and had been subsequently merged into one common action. CD Projekt proposed a settlement with the investors in December 2021, providing  to the group as part of the terms which was approved by a judge in January 2023. Poland's Office of Competition and Consumer Protection began an investigation of the game in January 2021, asking CD Projekt for an "explanation regarding problems with the game and actions taken by them". Having previously asked its employees to work 6-day weeks for several final months of the development of the game, the company ditched plans to tie developers' bonuses to review scores, choosing instead to pay out the full bonus regardless.

Jason Schreier of Bloomberg News said that, based on discussions with CD Projekt developers, a major reason for the poor performance of Cyberpunk 2077 on release was underestimating the effort that would be needed. While more than twice as many developers were brought on board to help with the game compared to The Witcher 3, CD Projekt had only expected the same amount of time to complete the game, so that the bulk of development towards the game only began in late 2016. The expanded scope of Cyberpunk 2077 including the game's new engine had created difficulties, and while there were more developers, there was less organization of their various functions that further hampered the development, according to Schreier's report. Many developers urged management to hold off on the game's release. Co-CEO Marcin Iwiński issued an open message to players on 13 January 2021, apologizing for the state of the game and the company's plans to correct it. Iwiński stated that the company "underestimated the risk" in bringing a game optimized to run on personal computers over to consoles, particularly the older Xbox One and PlayStation 4 consoles. He specifically faulted the in-game streaming engine that was used to load in assets from storage on the fly as the player moved through the game, which was scaled back to work on the older consoles. While they had tested these versions as they approached release, they had not seen the same issues that players had reported in the released version. He affirmed that the developers were not responsible for the release state of the game, but instead this was a choice made by himself and the other management of the company. Besides working to issue refunds and bring the game to a state to return it to the PlayStation Store, Iwiński outlined a year-long path that will involve multiple patches to bring the older consoles' versions to better performance and then looking to optimizing the game for newer consoles, prior to any further additional content development.

Sales 
Cyberpunk 2077 received eight million pre-orders on all platforms, of which 74% were digital, and it received more pre-orders than The Witcher3: Wild Hunt; one third of PC sales were through GOG.com. It was a best-seller on Steam in China. CD Projekt Red has stated that digital preorders for the title alone recouped the game's production cost as well as the game's 2020 marketing cost. According to a CD Projekt investors call, sales saw a drastic decline four days after release owing to the technical issues present. After the launch, analyst estimations for sales over 12 months fell from 30 million to 25.6 million.

Within twelve hours after its release, the game had over one million concurrent players on Steam. The PlayStation 4 version of Cyberpunk 2077 sold an estimated 104,600 physical copies during its debut week in Japan, making it the second highest selling retail game of the week in the country. The game passed 13 million copies sold in December 2020. It had the biggest digital game launch of all time, selling  digital units and grossing  in digital sales . As of September 2022, the game has sold more than 20 million copies worldwide.

Awards

Related media
An anime series, Cyberpunk: Edgerunners, was released in 2022. The series serves as a prequel, taking place about a year before the events of Cyberpunk 2077.

"I Really Want to Stay at Your House" is a song by British singer Rosa Walton written for the game. Featured in the fictional radio station 98.7 Body Heat Radio, the song was included by Lakeshore Records on the soundtrack album Cyberpunk 2077: Radio, Vol. 2 (Original Soundtrack), which was released on 18 December 2020. The song would later on go viral in 2022 after being utilised heavily in Edgerunners and chart in the United Kingdom at number 68.

Sequel

A sequel, codenamed Project Orion, was announced in October 2022. It will be developed by CD Projekt North America, which has studios in both Vancouver and Boston. Several core team members working on Cyberpunk 2077 will be relocated to Boston to work on the game. The game's development will begin following the release of Phantom Liberty.

Notes

References

Further reading

External links 

 

2020 video games
Action role-playing video games
Alternate history video games
Biorobotics in fiction
CD Projekt games
Cybernetted society in fiction
Cyberpunk (role-playing game)
Cyberpunk video games
Dystopian video games
Fiction about consciousness transfer
Fiction about corporate warfare
Fiction about memory erasure and alteration
Fiction about mind control
Fiction set in 2077
Fighting games
First-person shooters
Flying cars in fiction
Gangs in fiction
Golden Joystick Award winners
Hacking video games
LGBT-related video games
Malware in fiction
Megacities in fiction
Nanotechnology in fiction
Neo-noir video games
Open-world video games
Organized crime video games
PlayStation 4 Pro enhanced games
PlayStation 4 games
PlayStation 5 games
Prosthetics in fiction
Retrofuturistic video games
Science fiction video games
Spike Chunsoft video games
Stadia games
Stealth video games
Transhumanism in video games
Video game controversies
Video games about artificial intelligence
Video games about crime
Video games about cyborgs
Video games about death
Video games about mass surveillance
Video games about revenge
Video games about robots
Video games about terrorism
Video games about virtual reality
Video games adapted into comics
Video games adapted into television shows
Video games based on tabletop role-playing games
Video games developed in Poland
Video games featuring protagonists of selectable gender
Video games scored by Marcin Przybyłowicz
Video games scored by Paul Leonard-Morgan
Video games set in 2023
Video games set in California
Video games set in the 2020s
Video games set in the 2070s
Video games set in the future
Video games with alternate endings
Video games with customizable avatars
Video games with downloadable content
Video games with time manipulation
Windows games
Works subject to a lawsuit
Xbox One X enhanced games
Xbox One games
Xbox Series X and Series S games